Mount Chadwick is a small, bare rock mountain,  high, situated  east-southeast of Mount Walton in the Outback Nunataks, Victoria Land, Antarctica. The topographical feature was first mapped by the United States Geological Survey from surveys and from U.S. Navy air photos, 1959–64, and named by the Advisory Committee on Antarctic Names for Dan M. Chadwick, meteorologist at the South Pole Station, 1968. The mountain lies situated on the Pennell Coast, a portion of Antarctica lying between Cape Williams and Cape Adare.

References 

Mountains of Victoria Land
Pennell Coast